Konstantin Kravchuk and Denys Molchanov won the title, defeating Andrey Golubev and Yuri Schukin 6–3, 6–4 in the final.

Seeds

Draw

Draw

References
 Main Draw

Lermontov Cup - Doubles
2012 Doubles
2012 in Russian tennis